Dromia is a genus of crabs in the family Dromiidae. It contains 6 extant species:
Dromia bollorei Forest, 1974
Dromia dormia (Linnaeus, 1763)
Dromia erythropus (George Edwards, 1771)
Dromia marmorea Forest, 1974
Dromia nodosa A. Milne-Edwards & Bouvier, 1898
Dromia personata (Linnaeus, 1758)
Two further species are known only from fossils.

References

Dromiacea